"The Class" is 1959 novelty song by American rock and roll recording artist Chubby Checker. It peaked number thirty-eight on the Billboard Hot 100 and was his first entry on the chart. In the song, Checker plays a music teacher who asks his class (Checker doing impressions of various musicians) for their homework, which are variations of Mary Had a Little Lamb. The musicians imitated are  Fats Domino, the Coasters, Elvis Presley, Cozy Cole, and the Chipmunks (who are referred to as Ricky, Frankie, and Fabian).

References

1959 debut singles
1959 songs
Chubby Checker songs
Cameo-Parkway Records singles
Songs with lyrics by Kal Mann